, also known by his religious name Sasaki Dōyō, was a Japanese poet, warrior, and bureaucrat of the Muromachi period.

Born in Ōmi Province, Sasaki Takauji served the regent Hōjō Takatoki briefly, before aiding the shōgun Ashikaga Takauji in overthrowing the Kenmu Restoration (in which the Emperor Go-Daigo sought to regain real power) and establishing the Ashikaga shogunate.  During his period of service to the shogunate, Sasaki Takauji served as shugo (military governor) of six provinces, and held a number of other important positions. He was also known for his waka and renga poetry, and contributed 81 of his poems to the first imperial anthology of renga, the Tsukubashū. He is portrayed in the epic Taiheiki as a paragon of elegance and luxury, and as the quintessential military aristocrat.  He exemplifies the extreme of extravagant taste known as "basara"  where "the love of the extraordinary and accumulation of objects was paramount", and hosted events such as the twenty-day-long flower viewing event at Oharano.

Family
 Foster Father: Sasaki Sadamune (1287-1305)
 Father: Sasaki Muneuji
 Mother: Sasaki Munetsuna’s daughter
 Wife: Nikaido Tokitsuna’s daughter
 Children:
 Sasaki Hidetsuna (d.1353)
 Sasaki Hidemune by Nikaido Tokitsuna’s daughter
 Sasaki Takahide (1328-1391) by Nikaido Tokitsuna’s daughter
 daughter married Akamatsu Norisuke
 daughter married Shiba ujiyori
 daughter married Rokkaku Ujiyori

References

"Sasaki Takauji." (1985). Kodansha Encyclopedia of Japan, Tokyo: Kodansha Ltd.

External links 
 Renga by Sasaki Dōyo: Selected from the Tsukubashū (Tsukuba Anthology), tr. by K. Selden, Japan Focus 14, 14, 6 (15 July 2016)

Samurai
1306 births
1373 deaths